La Llorona is an album by Mexican singer Chavela Vargas. It was recorded in Madrid and released in 1994 by WEA. Vargas was accompanied on the recording by guitarists Marcela Rodríguez and Oscar Ramos.  National Public Radio called it one of her strongest albums.

Track listing
 	Cruz de Olvido
	Sombras
	Rogaciano
	La China
	Amanecí en tus Brazos
	Luz de Luna
	De un Mundo Raro
	La Llorona
	Toda una Vida
	A Prisión Perpetua
	El Andariego

References

1994 albums
Chavela Vargas albums